The Bulgarian Eastern Orthodox Diocese of the USA, Canada, and Australia is one of fifteen dioceses of the Church of Bulgaria. The diocese is led by Metropolitan Joseph (Bosakov).

History

The Bulgarian Eastern Orthodox Diocese of the USA, Canada, and Australia had its origins before World War II as the Bulgarian Diocese of North and South America and Australia. However, a result of the establishment of a Communist government in Bulgaria after the war, relations of the diocese with the Church of Bulgaria were disrupted. Under Metropolitan Andrew (Petkov), the diocese attempted, in the late 1950s, to join the Metropolia but was unsuccessful.

In 1964, Metropolitan Andrew petitioned the Holy Synod of the Church of Bulgaria for his return to the Bulgarian episcopacy and to continue to lead the diocese in America. With the return of Metropolitan Andrew and his diocese to the Church of Bulgaria, a group under Archimandrite Kyrill (Yonchev) broke with Andrew and joined the Russian Orthodox Church Outside of Russia (ROCOR) as the Bulgarian Diocese in Exile. The ROCOR bishops consecrated him bishop.

The Metropolitan Andrew's diocese is currently led by Metropolitan Joseph (Bosakov) with parishes in the United States, Canada, and Australia as an overseas diocese of the Church of Bulgaria under Patriarch Neophyte and the Bulgarian Synod of Bishops. The diocesan cathedral is Saints Cyril and Methodius Orthodox Cathedral in New York, USA.

The Bulgarian Eastern Orthodox Diocese of the USA, Canada, and Australia was a member of the Standing Conference of the Canonical Orthodox Bishops in the Americas until its replacement by the Assembly of Canonical Orthodox Bishops of the United States of America, where it is now a member.

List of Parishes

Source: Official site of the Diocese

See also
Bulgarian Diocese of the Orthodox Church in America

External links
 Bulgarian Diocese of the USA, Canada, and Australia

Sources
OrthodoxWiki Source for Article

References

Eastern Orthodoxy in the United States
Bulgarian Orthodox Church
Eastern Orthodox dioceses in Canada
Bulgarian-American history
Bulgarian Canadian
European-Australian culture
Eastern Orthodoxy in Australia